Blond is an unincorporated community in St. Tammany Parish, Louisiana, United States.

References

Unincorporated communities in St. Tammany Parish, Louisiana
Unincorporated communities in Louisiana
Unincorporated communities in New Orleans metropolitan area